The Complete Matrix Tapes is a live album by the New York City-based experimental rock band the Velvet Underground, released on November 20, 2015. It features unexpurgated recordings of the band's two-night stint on November 26 and 27, 1969, at San Francisco club The Matrix, owned and operated by Jefferson Airplane's Marty Balin.

Background
The band's appearance represents one of the rare occasions on which the Velvet Underground was professionally recorded in a live setting, and while several of the performances in this set have been released in various fashions and configurations before (in particular, on the album 1969: The Velvet Underground Live and the 45th anniversary reissue of The Velvet Underground, as well as via much lower-quality audience recordings in Bootleg Series Volume 1: The Quine Tapes), it is the first time all of them have been collected together. Additionally, this represents the first time much of this material has been presented in a CD version sourced directly from the original tapes, which had been considered lost for decades, and nine tracks from this collection had previously been completely unreleased in any configuration.

Two of the songs from these performances, "Over You" and "Sweet Bonnie Brown/It's Too Much", have never been released as studio recordings by the band, and it is not known whether the band ever recorded them in the studio. Songs such as "Sweet Jane" and "New Age" feature significantly different or expanded lyrics from their eventual studio counterparts (which would both be released in 1970 on Loaded), while others such as "Sister Ray" and "White Light/White Heat" are substantially longer than their studio versions.

Reception

The album – which received a Metacritic score of 86 based on 13 reviews (indicating "universal acclaim") – was widely praised both for its sound quality and for the power of its performances.

Track listing
All songs written by Lou Reed, except where noted.

Total length: 4:34:42

Personnel
The Velvet Underground
 Lou Reed – lead and backing vocals, guitar
 Sterling Morrison – guitar, bass, backing vocals
 Doug Yule – lead and backing vocals, bass, organ
 Maureen Tucker – lead and backing vocals, drums, percussion

Additional credits

Bill Levenson – compilation producer
Meire Murakami – design
David Fricke – liner notes
Kevin Reeves – mastering
Tardon – mixing
Dan Rose – production manager
Monique McGuffin Newman – production manager
Peter Abram – recording
Sal Mercuri – research, production manager
Alfredo Garcia, Lau Buur Nielsen, Oliver Landemaine – photo research assistance

References

The Velvet Underground albums
2015 live albums